Pizza Haven is the name of two unrelated, now defunct fast food chain restaurants:

Pizza Haven (United States)
Pizza Haven (Australia)